The Rye Neck Union Free School District is the school district created to serve the public education needs of parts of Mamaroneck and Rye, New York.

It serves the part of the Village of Mamaroneck that is within the Town of Rye and part of the City of Rye.

Rye Neck's district has four schools located on three different campuses, the middle and high schools being attached.

Rye Neck is known for its up-to-date technology in the classrooms, such as interactive whiteboards in every room, and its fully fiber optic network, provided by Optimum Lightpath, connecting every computer in the four schools. All are Schools of Excellence. The elementary school, F.E. Bellows, which teaches grades three through five, was named a Blue Ribbon School in 2009, one of 314 schools so honored across the country. Rye Neck High School was ranked #97 on Newsweek's 2005 list of the Best High Schools in America. The Rye Neck district was ranked 22nd out of over 8,700 school districts nationally in the Niche 2015 school district rankings.  The Rye Neck Theatre Program is known for its award-winning musicals for over 30 years and has won multiple awards and nominations.

The school district comprises two elementary schools serving grades K-5:
 Daniel Warren Elementary School for grades K to 2
 F. E. Bellows Elementary School for grades 3 to 5

There is one middle school serving grades 6-8:
 Rye Neck Middle School

And one high school serving grades 9-12:
 Rye Neck High School

See also 
 Immediato v. Rye Neck School District

References

External links 
 The Rye Neck Schools website

Mamaroneck, New York
School districts in New York (state)
Education in Westchester County, New York